At the 2010 Asian Games in the Women's singles tennis event, Zheng Jie was defending champion, but chose not to participate.

Peng Shuai defeated Akgul Amanmuradova in the final 7–5, 6–2.

Schedule
All times are China Standard Time (UTC+08:00)

Results

Final

Top half

Bottom half

References
Draw

Women's singles